The Indestructible Man is a BBC Books original novel written by Simon Messingham and based on the long-running British science fiction television series Doctor Who. The novel features the Second Doctor, Jamie and Zoe.

It depicts a world modelled on television programmes created by Gerry Anderson, in particular Stingray, Thunderbirds, Captain Scarlet and the Mysterons (e.g. the indestructible man of the novel's title, the flying base of operations and the alien threat) and UFO (carried over to the cover in which Zoe's purple wig echoes that of the female Moonbase personnel in UFO). However, The Indestructible Man depicts a dystopian future in contrast to the more utopian style of Anderson's earlier work.

Plot
Captain Karl Taylor is sent to investigate mysterious alien signals from the Moon, but the sights and sounds of the alien “city” he encounters are entirely incomprehensible to human perceptions. Taylor thus orders his people to open fire, apparently fearing that they are under attack. This is the start of a war between the alien Myloki and PRISM, the secret organisation created to fight the invaders. The Myloki attack by transforming ordinary human beings into their puppets; most are merely drone-like zombies known as Shiners, but two are different. One is Captain Taylor, who is sent back to Earth as a walking, indestructible, reanimated corpse, an emotionless killing machine. The other is Captain Grant Matthews, who is killed and duplicated while on a routine escort mission; however, his duplicate is caught and deprogrammed of his Myloki conditioning, and, like Taylor, is found to be literally indestructible.

The Doctor and Storm trace Verdana to a private hospice in Barbados, where his body is slowly wasting away, perhaps due to the hours he spent monitoring the Myloki’s unfathomably alien signals during the war. He is bitter that he’s been condemned to this slow death while Matthews, a jumped-up clerk and chauffeur, became immortal; this is why he wrote the book exposing PRISM. He refuses to help track down Matthews, but when he makes a snide comment about Matthews’ rich friends, Storm deduces where Matthews must be. Storm offers to put Verdana out of his misery, but Verdana refuses, determined to cling on to life until the bitter end. As the Doctor and Storm leave the hospice, Storm admits to the Doctor that he was a mercenary for hire before the war; Bishop freed him from a Polish prison and gave him the authority to kill whoever he had to defeat the Myloki.

John Sharon, once the wild child of the Sharon family, is now working as a doctor for an isolated tribe in a tropical rainforest. A nearby village was recently struck by a blast from the Myloki grid, and the Doctor chips in to help John tend to those affected by the blast; like everything else touched by the Myloki, however, their bodies have been warped by contact with the alien energy, and the Doctor knows that he can do nothing to save the victims’ lives. John eventually explains to the Doctor that the people of the world turned on Matthews, fearing what he had become, after Verdana’s exposé revealed his secret; Matthews turned to Buck for help, and he agreed to let Matthews hide out on the Sharons’ private island. As far as John knows, Matthews is still there. However, John is torn by conflicting emotions regarding his family and his inability to live up to their shining example, and when the Doctor sees that the photographs of John’s beloved family members have been repeatedly defaced, he realises there’s nothing he can do to help the unfortunate man.

Specific references in the novel

Stingray
Submarine Manta – Submarine Stingray
Captain Hector – Troy Tempest
Lieutenant Faulkner – Lieutenant George "Phones" Sheridan

Thunderbirds
Global Response – International Rescue
"Lightnings Strike!" - "Thunderbirds Are Go!"
Lightning Five – Thunderbird Five
Sharon Island – Tracy Island
Sharon Consortium – Tracy Corporation (mentioned in spin-off media)
Abercrombie – Parker {John Sharon mentions he named the tribesman after a "butler"}
Alton Sharon – Alan Tracy
Buck Sharon – Jeff Tracy
Professor Dwight "Boffin" Graham – Professor "Brains" 'Hackenbacker'.
Graham – Gordon Tracy
Homer Sharon – Virgil Tracy
John Sharon – John Tracy (Though he is erroneously stated to be the youngest)
Skip Sharon – Scott Tracy

Captain Scarlet and the Mysterons
CHERUB attack craft – Angel Attack Craft
P.R.I.S.M. – SPECTRUM
SKYHOME – Cloudbase
Captain Grant Matthews – Captain Scarlet (Paul Metcalfe) (named after actors Francis Matthews and Cy Grant)
Captain Adam Nelson – Captain Blue (Adam Svenson)
Captain Taylor – Captain Black
Lieutenant Neville Verdana – Lieutenant Green
Colonel LeBlanc – Colonel White

UFO
BFTV Studio – Harlington-Straker Film Studio
BLOCKER – Interceptor
KINGFISHER – SkyDiver (King/Sky One, Fisher/Diver)
Lunar Base – Moonbase
MOVER – Mobiles
S.E.W.A.R.D. – S.I.D.
S.I.L.O.E.T. – S.H.A.D.O.
Alex Storm – Alec Freeman {name is typical of early Anderson era – "Mike Mercury", "Doctor Venus", etc.}
Lieutenant Anouska – An unnamed SHADO operative portrayed by actress Anouska Hempel in four episodes
Captain Drake – Captain Peter Carlin or Captain Lew Waterman {both UFO; Carlin was replaced by Waterman about a quarter of the way through the season after Peter Gordeno, who played Carlin, left}
Lieutenant Gabrielle – Lieutenant Ellis {Named after actress Gabrielle Drake}
Commander Hal Bishop – Commander Ed Straker {Named after actor Ed Bishop}
Helen Bishop – Mary Straker {although she did not die, her and Ed's son John Rutland (named after his new stepfather) died after Straker failed to deliver the drugs that would have saved his life}
Doctor Koslovski – Doctor Jackson {It was never determined as to whether Jackson was German or Russian}
The Myloki – methods from The Mysterons {Captain Scarlet}; ideology from the unnamed aliens that attacked Earth in the 1980s
Doctor Ventham – Colonel Virginia Lake {UFO; named after actress Wanda Ventham, who played Lake and who also guest-starred in multiple Doctor Who episodes}
In addition, the Doctor has a nightmare early in the book, in which he views the Earth and Moon receding into the blackness of space, then the Sun, until an unknown planet looms suddenly into view. This is a clear prose rendition of UFO's usual closing credits sequence.

The Myloki are described as never having a physical form. This is the same in UFO, where the unnamed aliens are only ever seen physically when possessing the body of a human. The Mysterions, which were seen on-screen as a series of flashing lights, were also capable of taking over bodies as well as producing replicas (Captain Scarlet, Captain Black). They would usually announce their intentions to SPECTRUM in the same creepy voices that Neville describes early on in his book at the start of every episode.

Other notes/references
Major Maxwell was possibly named after either actress Lois Maxwell, most famous as Miss Moneypenny but also the voice actress for Atlanta Shore from Stingray and appeared in two episodes of UFO as Straker's temporary secretary, Maxwell Shore who played SHADO medic Doctor Schroeder, or Skydiver's Lieutenant Gordon Maxwell.
Several quotes are taken from Captain Scarlet, namely "But first they must destroy." (Bishop) and "One man fate has made indestructible." (Neville & various). Both of these are taken from the title sequence of Captain Scarlet, which was read by Ed Bishop, who played both Captain Blue on Captain Scarlet and Ed Straker on UFO.
There are startling contrasts between Messingham's universe and Anderson's. For example, while Alec Freeman often acted as a "strongman" to help with Straker's intentions, he was never physically violent to anyone unless attacked first. (See: Court Martial). Alex Storm, on the other hand, is portrayed as having a violent temper. Also, Lieutenant Gabrielle is written as spiteful and vain, whereas Lieutenant Ellis was cold and efficient, but not deliberately cruel. Bishop drinks alcohol – whiskey, a drink Straker is always fixing for Alec Freeman – whereas Straker is teetotal.
Zoe is referenced as to wearing the SKYHOME uniform, which is a short silver skirt, lycra top and purple wig. This is the uniform of the Moonbase personnel in UFO. Similarly, much of SKYHOME's architecture is written as identical to a crossover of Moonbase and Cloudbase. Also, the hats the natives wear in chapter XXI are modelled after Thunderbird Two, and the crashed craft the Doctor and Storm find is Lightning Two, Thunderbird Two's counterpart. John Sharon's brothers are described in their portraits as wearing "a purple uniform with a diagonal blue sash".
Hal Bishop's car is identical in descriptions to Ed Straker's car. Colonel Paul Foster also drove a car of the same model, although his was in lilac.
The events of Captain Taylor being captured/duplicated by the Myloki and the circumstances leading to PRISM discovering that Captain Grant Matthews was a clone are directly taken from the first episode of Captain Scarlet. Also, Koslovski claims that the first encounter with Captain Taylor was in a French graveyard – at the beginning of every Captain Scarlet episode Captain Black was introduced standing in said graveyard.
"Spoken like a true television detective," remarks the Doctor to Alex Storm. George Sewell, the actor who played Alec Freeman, left UFO to become a cynical television detective.
The phrase "MIC" – Message is Clear, also the title of Neville's book – is a play-off of the multiple phrases coined by various Gerry Anderson productions. Stingray had "PWOR" (Proceeding With Orders Received), Thunderbirds had the infamous "FAB" (no actual definition of this has been given, although some spin-off media have settled on "For All Brothers", considering that the main operatives of International Rescue were siblings; the Andersons have said many times that FAB is not an acronym but an abbreviated form of "fabulous" that was in common use at the time the series was made), and Captain Scarlet "SIG" and "SIR" (Spectrum Is Green/Red). These signature phrases died off with the subsequent live-action shows of UFO and Space: 1999.
While the date is correct for Captain Scarlet – the book placing the "war" between the Mysterons and humans in 2068 – it is incorrect for UFO, which took place in the 1980s.
During the Myloki attack, it is stated that Lunar Base has been replaced by a crater, "as if that part of the moon has drifted off into space" – presumably a reference to Space: 1999.

Reception
Richard McGinlay of sci-fi-online.com gives The Indestructible Man a mixed review, calling it "an intriguing book, but sadly not tremendously riveting. The narrative reads like a sequence of events that are not strung together very tightly by the slender plot. Still, it should help you to destroy a few long winter evenings, especially if you're an Anderson fan."

References

External links
The Cloister Library – The Indestructible Man

2004 British novels
2004 science fiction novels
Past Doctor Adventures
Second Doctor novels
Novels by Simon Messingham